19 Linden Street is a historic house located in Brookline, Massachusetts. It is a well-preserved local example of Greek Revival styling, and the best-preserved survivor of a residential subdivision developed in the 1840s.

Description and history 
This -story wood-frame house was built in 1843–44. Unlike many Greek Revival houses, it has a side-gable roof, but it has corner pilasters and a single-story porch with Greek columns, and the gable is fully pedimented.

The house was listed on the National Register of Historic Places on October 17, 1985.

See also
National Register of Historic Places listings in Brookline, Massachusetts

References

Houses completed in 1843
Houses in Brookline, Massachusetts
National Register of Historic Places in Brookline, Massachusetts
1843 establishments in Massachusetts
Houses on the National Register of Historic Places in Norfolk County, Massachusetts
Greek Revival houses in Massachusetts